History of ABC may refer to:
 History of the American Broadcasting Company
 History of the Australian Broadcasting Corporation